Wenallt is a hamlet in the  community of Trawsgoed, Ceredigion, Wales,  southeast of Aberystwyth. Wenallt is represented in the Senedd by Elin Jones (Plaid Cymru) and is part of the Ceredigion constituency in the House of Commons.

References

See also
Gallt y Wenallt - a subsidiary summit of Y Lliwedd in Snowdonia National Park
List of localities in Wales by population

Villages in Ceredigion